Elise Neumann Hedinger (1854-1923)  was a German painter known for her still life painting.

Biography
Hedinger née Neumann was born on 3 July 1854 in Berlin, Germany.  She studied in Germany and France with Charles Hoguet, Albert Hertel, Eugen Bracht, and Karl Gussow. Hedinger exhibited her work at the Woman's Building at the 1893 World's Columbian Exposition in Chicago, Illinois.

Hedinger died in 1873.

References

1854 births
1923 deaths
19th-century German women artists
19th-century German painters
20th-century German women artists
20th-century German painters
Artists from Berlin